A monsoon is a seasonal prevailing wind which lasts for several months.

Monsoon may also refer to:

Business
 Monsoon (speakers), a brand of loudspeakers
 Monsoon Accessorize, a British clothing retailer
 Monsoon Books, a publishing firm

Fictional characters
 Monsoon (comics), a mutant in the Marvel Comics universe
 Edina Monsoon, from the British television series Absolutely Fabulous
 Monsoon, from the video game Metal Gear Rising: Revengeance
 Saffron Monsoon, from the British television series Absolutely Fabulous

Film
 Monsoon (1943 film), a reissue title for Isle of Forgotten Sins, a 1943 PRC film
 Monsoon (1952 film), an American film
 Monsoon (2014 film), a Canadian documentary about the monsoon season in India
 Monsoon (2015 film), an Indian film
 Monsoon (2019 film), a British film

Music 
 Monsoon (band), a 1980s UK world/pop trio
 Monsoon (Little River Band album), 1988
 Monsoon (Caroline's Spine album)
 Monsoon (Preston School of Industry album)
 "Monsoon", a song by ...And You Will Know Us by the Trail of Dead from their 2002 album Source Tags & Codes
 "Monsoon", a song by Enon from their 2003 album Hocus Pocus
 "Monsoon", a song by Jack Johnson from his 2008 album Sleep Through the Static
 "Monsoon", a song by Robbie Williams from his 2002 album Escapology
 "Monsoon", the English-language version of the German hit song "Durch den Monsun" by Tokio Hotel from their 2007 album Scream

People
 Gorilla Monsoon (1937-1999), American professional wrestler 
 Jinkx Monsoon, drag queen and winner of RuPaul's Drag Race season 5

Other uses 
Monsoon (novel), by Wilbur Smith
Apollo Monsoon, a Hungarian ultralight trike aircraft
Monsoon Group, a German U-boat force during World War II
Monsoon (photographs), a series of photographs taken by Brian Brake in India in 1960
Mil Mi-35 (Monsoon), a Russian attack helicopter
Monsoon, a combat robot in BattleBots (season 8) and BattleBots (season 9)

See also